A closed-household economy is a society's economic system in which goods are not traded. Instead, those goods are produced and consumed by the same households. In other words, a closed-household economy is an economy where households are closed to trading. This kind of economy is present, for example, in hunter-gatherer societies.

The production and consumption of goods is not separated as in a society with high division of labor.

The closed-household economy contrasts with a barter economy, in which goods are bartered (traded against each other), and a monetary economy, in which goods are traded for money.

The closed-household economy and the barter economy are together referred to as non-monetary economies.

Self-sustainability
Home economics